Franco Restivo (25 May 1911 – 17 April 1976) was an Italian politician.

Biography
Franco Restivo was son of Empedocle Restivo, a jurist and national deputy. He studied law at the University of Palermo and in 1943 he became a professor of constitutional law at the Faculty of Law of the Sicilian university; later teaching public law at the Faculty of economics and commerce of the same university.

He was member of the Constituent Assembly between 1946 and 1947, of the Sicilian Regional Assembly between 1947 and 1958, and a national Deputy from 1958 until his death.

Between 1949 and 1955 he served as President of the Sicilian Region. After his return to national politics, he also served as a Minister of Agricolture (Moro III Cabinet), as Minister of the Interior (Leone II Cabinet, Rumor I Cabinet, Rumor II Cabinet, Rumor III Cabinet and Colombo Cabinet), and as Minister of Defence (Andreotti I Cabinet).

During the period in which he held the dicastery of the Interior, Restivo faced a situation of serious deterioration of public order, the
massacre of Piazza Fontana, worsening of common and mafia crime, youth protestsand political terrorism.

Death
Franco Restivo died 17 April 1976, a few months before the end of the VI Legislature.

In popular culture 
Restivo is portrayed by 
Fabrizio Bentivoglio in the 2020 film Rose Island.

Honors and awards
 Chancellor and Treasurer of the Military Order of Italy (17 February 1972 – 26 June 1972)
 Grand Cross of Merit with German Order of Merit Plaque (1957)

References

External links

1911 births
1976 deaths
Presidents of Sicily
Politicians from Palermo
Italian Ministers of the Interior
Christian Democracy (Italy) politicians
Italian Ministers of Defence
Members of the Constituent Assembly of Italy
Deputies of Legislature III of Italy
Deputies of Legislature IV of Italy
Deputies of Legislature V of Italy
Deputies of Legislature VI of Italy
Knights Commander of the Order of Merit of the Federal Republic of Germany
University of Palermo alumni